KCKB (104.1 MHz) is a radio station licensed to Moran, Texas. The station airs a Christian format, along with secular conservative talk programs. It is owned by Positive Radio Network, LLC. It is an affiliate of the Rangers Radio Network.

History
The construction permit for KCKB was granted February 28, 2017 and was held by Brazos TV, Inc. The permit was sold later that year to Two Way Communications for $10,000. In 2018, the permit for KCKB was sold to Positive Radio Network, LLC, along with KBLY, for $87,000. The station began broadcasting on February 1, 2019.

References

External links

CKB
Radio stations established in 2019
2019 establishments in Texas